Sidhwan Bet  is a village in Jagraon Tehsil in Ludhiana district of Punjab State, India.

References

Villages in Kapurthala district